Joseph Athanase Tshamala Kabasele (16 December 1930 in Matadi, Belgian Congo (now Democratic Republic of the Congo) – 11 February 1983 in Paris, France), popularly known as Le Grand Kallé, was a Congolese singer and bandleader, considered the father of modern Congolese music. He is best known for his role as leader of the band, Le Grand Kallé et l'African Jazz, in which capacity he was involved in a number of noted songs, including Indépendance Cha Cha.

Background
Joseph Athanase Tchamala Kabasele was born in Matadi, Bas-Congo in what was then the Belgian Congo, modern Democratic Republic of Congo. He came from a prominent Congolese family, which included Cardinal Joseph Malula. Kallé went to secondary school and became a typist at a succession of commercial firms in the capital of the Belgian Congo, Léopoldville.

Career
In the early 1950s, at a new recording studio called Opika, Kasabele received an opportunity to pursue a career in music. He joined with two of the session guitarists at Opika records, Georges Doula and Albert Yamba-Yamba, to form a combo called Groupe Doula Georges. In 1951 Doula and his band starred in a publicity film for the radio station Voix de la Concorde, which operated under the call letters "OTC." To capitalize on the notoriety gained from the film, the band chose to rename themselves OTC.

In 1953, disillusioned with the lack of modernisation at OTC, he formed l'African Jazz, which some consider to be the most important Congolese band. L'African Jazz was one of the most popular early African Rumba bands. At its height, L'African Jazz included big names like guitarist Dr Nico Kasanda, saxophonist Manu Dibango and singers Tabu Ley Rochereau, Sam Mangwana and Pepe Kalle.

In 1960, he established his own label, Subourboum Jazz, which was home to Franco Luambo's TPOK Jazz. Grand Kallé was responsible for striking deals with European record labels to ensure high quality recordings of his band's music for the Francophone market.

In the mid-1960s, Kallé suffered his first major setback when two of his protégés (Tabu Ley Rochereau and Dr Nico Kasanda) left to form their own group called Africa Fiesta. Kallé never recovered from this setback, concentrating on nurturing the talent of singer Pépé Kallé.

Political influence

As a prominent figure in the Belgian Congo, Kallé was chosen as a member of the Congolese delegation at the "Round Table Conference" on Congolese independence in 1960. He composed several songs on a political themes, notably "Indépendance Cha Cha" and "Table Ronde".

Death
Le Grand Kallé died in a hospital in Paris, France, on 11 February 1983. He was buried in Gombe Cemetery in Kinshasa.

Musical influence
Kabasele was one of the great African singers of the twentieth century. He was the first musician to mix Cuban rhythms with a traditional African beat to create what is now known as Soukous. He was also the first African musician to create his own record label.
He has been referred to as the "Father of Congolese Music."

Discography
Albums, including compilations
 Merveilles Du Passé – Hommage Au Grand Kalle Vol. 2 (1984, African)
 Essous / Kwamy / Mujos / Edo / Casino (1993, Sonodisc)
 1966 – 1967 (1993, Grand Kalle/Syllart)
 Grand Kallé et African Team, Vol. 1 (1993, Grand Kalle/Syllart)
 Grand Kalle et l'African Jazz 1961–1962 (Merveilles du passé, vol. 2) (1993, Sonodisc)
 Grand Kalle & L'African Team (1997, Sonodisc)
 Le Grand Kalle (2013, Le Monde des Artistes)
 Jolie Nana (2013, Marylebone Records)
 Joseph Kabasele, Le Grand Kalle: His Life, His Music (2013, Sterns Africa)
 The History Of Le Grand Kallé, Vol. 1 (2013, Diamond Days)
 The History Of Le Grand Kallé, Vol. 2 (2013, Diamond Days)
 The History Of Le Grand Kallé, Vol. 3 (2013, Diamond Days)
 The History Of Le Grand Kallé, Vol. 4 (2013, Diamond Days)
 The History Of Le Grand Kallé, Vol. 5 (2013, Diamond Days)
 Butsana Mama: Le Grand Kallé & His Songs, Vol. 1 (2013, Supreme Media)
 Butsana Mama: Le Grand Kallé & His Songs, Vol. 2 (2013, Supreme Media)
 Butsana Mama: Le Grand Kallé & His Songs, Vol. 3 (2013, Supreme Media)
 Butsana Mama: Le Grand Kallé & His Songs, Vol. 4 (2013, Supreme Media)
 Butsana Mama: Le Grand Kallé & His Songs, Vol. 5 (2013, Supreme Media)
Contributing artist
 The Rough Guide to Congo Gold (2008, World Music Network)
 Authenticité Vol. 2 (2014, Eben Entertainment)
As leader of Le Grand Kallé et l'African Jazz
(see that page)

External links
 Grand Kallé: The founder of modern Congolese music
 Rumba on the River, the Grand Kallé

References 

1930 births
1983 deaths
People from Matadi
20th-century Democratic Republic of the Congo male singers
Democratic Republic of the Congo musicians
Soukous musicians